Eric Khaled Saade (born 29 October 1990), is a Swedish singer and songwriter.

He spent two years with the boy band What's Up!, leaving the band in February 2009 to pursue a solo career. After winning the Swedish Melodifestivalen 2011 with "Popular", Saade represented Sweden at the Eurovision Song Contest 2011 in Germany, placing third.

Early life
Saade was born in Kattarp, a small village in Helsingborg Municipality, Scania, Sweden, to Marlene Jacobsson, a Swede, and Walid Saade, a Palestinian from Lebanon. After his parents divorced when he was four, he lived with his mother. Saade is the second of eight siblings and half-siblings.

Saade began singing after seeing Michael Jackson on TV, and his other musical influences are Robbie Williams, Bryan Adams, the Backstreet Boys and Justin Timberlake.

Career

2007: What's Up!
In 2007, Saade was a founding member of What's Up!, a Swedish boy band which included Robin Stjernberg, Ludwig "hejLudde" Keijser and Johan Yngvesson. Its members were picked from a competition attracting hundreds of applicants. Fifteen finalists (including Saade) competed at the Ericsson Globe, and the four winners became the band's founding members.

What's Up! began touring Sweden in the spring of 2008 and released an album, In Pose, which spent a week on the Swedish Albums Chart at #40. The album spawned two singles: "Go Girl!", released in May 2007, peaked at #5 on the Swedish Singles Chart and "If I Told You Once", released in March 2008, peaked at #16. The band recorded the Swedish version of the theme for Disney's Camp Rock ("Här är jag") and dubbed the characters' voices, appearing in the Disney Channel's Swedish trailer. When Saade left the band to pursue a solo career, he was replaced by Johannes Magnusson.

2008-2009: Solo beginnings and Melodifestivalen debut
Saade's involvement in Camp Rock led to his hosting a show inspired by the movie; he also hosted the nationwide contest, Julia's Shooting Stars. In August 2009, Saade signed with the Swedish record label Roxy Recordings; in December he released his first solo single, "Sleepless", written by Fredrik Kempe and Peter Boström. Distributed on iTunes, the song peaked at #44 in Sweden. Anders Rune directed its music video, which premiered in January 2010.

In February 2010, Saade sang "Manboy", written by Fredrik Kempe and Peter Boström, at the second semi-final of Melodifestivalen 2010 (the Swedish qualifier for the Eurovision Song Contest). He won the semifinal, finishing third overall. "Manboy" was released in March 2010 in Sweden, reaching #1 on the domestic-single and ringtone charts; its music video also premiered that month. The song's acoustic version was released in Sweden in May,
and in June the single went platinum in that country.

2010: Breakthrough in Sweden

In January 2010, Saade won a Scandipop Award as the Brightest New Hope for 2010. In March he was nominated for a Marcel Bezençon Press Award for "Manboy", and won an Artistic Award. Saade released his first solo album, Masquerade, in May 2010. The album reached #2 in Sweden, and went gold. Saade began his first solo tour, known as the Masquerade Tour, playing 24 dates in Sweden from June to September 2010.

The third single from Saade's debut album, "Break of Dawn" (written by Saade and Fredrik Kempe), was released in June 2010 and peaked at #45 on the Swedish charts. The song's music video also premiered that month. A remix, "Le Family Remix", was released in July.

In August 2010, Saade was nominated for three Rockbjörnen Awards: Best Swedish Male Live Artist, Best Breakthrough Act and Best Swedish Song of the Year (for "Manboy"). That year, Saade also released the singles "Masquerade" and "It's Gonna Rain". The music video for "Masquerade" premiered in August, and the video for "It's Gonna Rain" premiered in October.

2011: Second Melodifestivalen attempt and Eurovision Song Contest
In February 2011, Saade entered the Melodifestivalen for a second time. This time he made the final, winning with "Popular" (written by Fredrik Kempe and produced by Peter Boström). The song's music video premiered in April.

In May 2011, Saade competed in the second semifinal of the Eurovision Song Contest 2011, advancing to the final. He finished third in the competition, Sweden's best placing since Charlotte Perrelli won in 1999 with "Take Me to Your Heaven". This was Sweden's fifth third-place finish at the Eurovision. "Popular" was released in Sweden in February 2011, reaching #1 on the Swedish charts. By July it sold over 40,000 copies in Sweden, reaching double platinum. Its music video premiered in April 2011, when the song was also released in Finland. The single was released in Norway on 6 May, in Australia, Greece, Ireland, Italy, Japan, Lithuania, Mexico, the Netherlands, New Zealand, Portugal, Spain, the UK and the US on 12 May, in Austria, Germany and Switzerland on 18 May and in Belgium on 20 May. "Popular" reached #4 in the Belgian (Flanders) Ultratip Charts, #17 in Finland, #23 in the Belgian (Wallonia) Ultratip, #29 in Austria, #27 in Ireland, #48 in Germany and #76 in the UK. The song was listed at #3 on PopJustice's list of 45 Best Singles of 2011. The album remix and slow versions of the song were released in Sweden in March 2011. The slow version was named Song of the Day by PopJustice on 15 May 2011, and the SoundFactory remix was released in Sweden on 25 May; another remix was released on 9 June in Greece.

Saade, Vols. 1 and 2
In January 2011 Saade was nominated for six Scandipop Awards: Best Single from a New Artist and Best Male Single (for "It's Gonna Rain" and "Manboy"), Best Male Album (for Masquerade) and Best New Artist, winning Best Album from a New Artist and Best Male.
That month, he was also nominated for a Song of the Year Grammis for "Manboy" and released the first single ("Still Loving It", co-written with Niclas Lundin and Anton Malmberg Hård Af Segerstad) from his second album.

Saade was nominated for a Marcel Bezençon Artistic Award (Melodifestivalen), and won a Press Award for "Popular". In April, he was nominated as Sweden's Favorite Star for a Nickelodeon Kids' Choice Award. In May, it was announced that Saade would release two new albums, Saade Vol. 1 and Saade Vol. 2. The first was released in Sweden and Norway in June. It topped the Swedish chart, selling 50,000 copies and certified platinum by July, and peaked at #16 in Finland.
In June, Saade won two ESC Radio Awards for "Popular": Best Male Artist and Best Song.

The second single from Saade Vol. 1 ("Hearts in the Air", a duet with J-Son) and its music video was released in June in Sweden and Norway and September in France. It peaked at #2 in Sweden, and was certified gold. A remix of the song was released in December in the UK.

Saade toured again from June to November, calling his show the "Made of Pop Concert". The tour included 24 concerts in Sweden and one in France; on 14 July, he performed for the Swedish crown princess Victoria and the royal family.

In July, the singer was nominated for two You Choice Awards for "Popular": Best Male Video and Best Newcomer. That month, he was also nominated for two Rockbjörnen Awards: Best Male Artist Live and Best Swedish Song ("Popular").

In November 2011 Saade released the single "Hotter Than Fire", a duet with Dev co-written with Jason Gill and J-Son. The song reached #5 in Sweden; it was later remixed, with its music video released in December. Saade Vol. 2 was also released in November, reaching #1 in Sweden and #46 in Finland, and the singer was the most-searched Swedish celebrity on Google that year.

Saade Vol.1 & Saade Vol. 2 were both released in the United Kingdom on 9 June 2014. They became available in the UK iTunes store along with Saade's first studio album 'Masquerade'.

2012: Forgive Me
Saade was nominated for six Scandipop Awards in 2012: Best Male, 2011 Readers' Favourite, Best Male Album (for Saade Vol. 1 and Saade Vol. 2), Best Male Single (for "Popular") and Best Remix (for "Popular [SoundFactory Remix]"), and was nominated for a Best Song Grammis for "Popular". In March and April Saade went on his third Swedish tour, "Pop Explosion Concert 2012", which included 15 concerts. In June, he released a new single with Norwegian singer Tone Damli entitled "Imagine"; its music video was released several weeks later.

The singer released two new singles in October: "Miss Unknown" and "Marching (In the Name of Love)", and said: "It has almost been a year without a new single. I've been writing a lot of new music, and want to include new influences. I've always loved RnB and Hip hop, and I want to mix it into my pop music. It might not be the most normal thing to release two singles at the same time, but I like to do things differently...and I love both songs equally!" A DVD of Saade's Pop Explosion Concert 2012 was released in November. The music video for "Marching (In the Name of Love)" was released on 7 December, and that for "Miss Unknown" was released on 12 December.

In April 2013 Eric announced his next album's title, Forgive Me, and released its first single ("Coming Home"). The song, co-written with J-Son and Mats Lie Skaare, was described by Saade's publicists as an urban-pop, summer song stylistically different (with the other songs on the album) from Saade's earlier work. He also said the album was influenced primarily by Justin Timberlake, Robbie Williams and Michael Jackson.

During the final of the Eurovision Song Contest 2013 in Malmö, Sweden, Saade was co-host in the "green room" (where finalists awaited results). While hosting, he said to co-host Petra Mede "Back to you, Petra. hashtag: MILF".

2015–18: Melodifestivalen return, Saade EP and Så mycket bättre
Saade participated in Melodifestivalen 2015 with the song "Sting" in a bid to represent Sweden in the Eurovision Song Contest 2015 in Vienna, Austria. The song was co-written by Sam Arash Fahmi, Fredrik Kempe, Hamed "K-one" Pirouzpanah and David Kreuger. He performed the song live during the first semi-final round of Melodifestivalen on 7 February 2015 in Gothenburg's Scandinavium. Coming first that day, he qualified to the Finals on 14 March 2015 in Stockholm. In the final Saade placed fifth after the televoting and jury results was revealed. On 22 May 2015 Saade released his new single "Girl From Sweden".

Saade released his extended play Saade on 24 June 2016. Saade released the lead single from Saade titled "Colors" on 18 March 2016. On 27 May 2016 the title track "Wide Awake" featuring Gustaf Norén was released as the album's second single.

On 25 May 2017 Saade released his new single "Another Week". In late 2017, Saade participated in the eight season of the reality TV-show Så mycket bättre. In December 2017, he released an EP called "Så mycket bättre 2017 – Tolkningarna" including 8 covered songs.

On 19 October 2018 Saade released a single "Så jävla fel". The single "Vill ha mer" featuring Parham was released on 16 November 2018.

2019–present: Det svarta fåret and Melodifestivalen returns 
On 26 October 2018, SVT announced that Saade will host all six shows of Melodifestivalen 2019 alongside Sarah Dawn Finer, Marika Carlsson and Kodjo Akolor. Saade was Swedish spokesperson for the Eurovision Song Contest 2019.

On 14 June 2019, Saade released the single "Skit för varandra". Saade's fifth studio album, Det svarta fåret was released in June 2020, which failed to enter any major music charts. The album yielded one top-forty hit song, "Postcard", featuring Swedish DJ, Anis Don Demina.

In December 2020, it was announced that Saade would participate in Melodifestivalen 2021 with his first original English-language song in four years, "Every Minute". He qualified for the final, which was held on 13 March 2021 where he came in second place behind Tusse. On 5 March 2022, Saade appeared in the first heat of Melodifestivalen 2022 as an interval act, where he performed a medley of all his Melodifestivalen entries: "Manboy", "Popular", "Sting" and "Every Minute", and was awarded the Melodifestivalen Hall of Fame.

He competes as a celebrity dancer in Let's Dance 2022, which is broadcast by TV4.

Personal life
Eric Saade dated singer Molly Sandén from 2007 to 2012. After the couple broke up, Eric was spotted in the company of Emma Andersson on holiday in Mexico, the couple decided to end their relationship. In 2015, he began dating Nicole Falciani, the couple became engaged on 1 January 2019. On 15 May 2020 the couple decided to end their relationship. In 2020 he began dating Hanna Schönberg.

Discography

Studio albums

Masquerade (2010)
Saade Vol. 1 (2011)
Saade Vol. 2 (2011)
Forgive Me (2013)
Det svarta fåret (2020)

Tours
 Masquerade Tour (2010)
 Made of Pop Concert (2011)
 Pop Explosion Concert (2012)
 Coming Home Tour (2013)
 Stripped Live Tour (2015)

Awards and nominations

Dubbing

References

External links

Eric Saade Official Website

1990 births
Living people
Swedish pop singers
Swedish male voice actors
Melodifestivalen winners
Swedish people of Palestinian descent
Swedish people of Lebanese descent
English-language singers from Sweden
Eurovision Song Contest entrants of 2011
Eurovision Song Contest entrants for Sweden
People from Helsingborg Municipality
21st-century Swedish singers
21st-century Swedish male singers
Melodifestivalen contestants of 2021
Melodifestivalen contestants of 2015
Melodifestivalen contestants of 2011
Melodifestivalen contestants of 2010